Software is Grace Slick's 1984 album released by RCA Records.  This album was recorded after re-joining Jefferson Starship.  After working on this album, Peter Wolf would go on to contribute to Jefferson Starship's 1984 album, Nuclear Furniture.  A music video was made for the single "All the Machines". Software is Grace Slick's fourth and final solo album which peaked at No. 206.

Software has been described as Slick's attempt to assimilate with the techno-pop artists of the period. Guitar use is largely replaced by synthesizers and electric drums. Slick's trademark wailing vocals and improvising is replaced by more short, precise bursts.

Track listing
All lyrics by Grace Slick / music by Peter Wolf except where noted

Singles
"All the Machines (edited)" – 3:34 b/w "All the Machines" – 4:47 (1984)
"Through the Window" b/w "Habits" (1984)

Personnel
Grace Slick – lead vocals, background vocals
Peter Wolf – keyboards, Linn programming, synth bass
Peter Maunu – guitars on all tracks except "Rearrange My Face"
Brian MacLeod – Simmons drums
Bret Bloomfield – Fender bass on "Me and Me"
Michael Spiro – percussion on "Me and Me", "Fox Face", "Rearrange My Face" and "Bikini Atoll"
Dale Strumpel – sound effects on "All the Machines" and "Bikini Atoll"
Sean Hopper, Paul Kantner – background vocals on "All the Machines" and "It Just Won't Stop"
John Colla, Mickey Thomas – background vocals on "Call It Right Call It Wrong", "Me and Me", "All the Machines", "Through the Window", "It Just Won't Stop" and "Rearrange My Face"
Ron Nevison – background vocals on "Me and Me"
Ina Wolf – background vocals

Production
Ron Nevison – producer, engineer, arrangements
Rick Sanchez – assistant engineer
Dee Dee Miller – production assistant
Peter Wolf – arrangements
Skip Johnson – manager
Michael Pangrazio – album cover illustrator
Paykos Phior – album cover design
Andrea Hein – album cover coordination, back cover concept
Grace Slick – front cover concept

References

Grace Slick albums
1984 albums
Albums produced by Ron Nevison
RCA Records albums